Masjed Abu ol Fazl or Masjed-e Abu ol Fazl may refer to:
 Masjed Abu ol Fazl, Sistan and Baluchestan